Brazilian Girls is a band from New York, United States, known for their eclectic blend of electronic dance music with musical styles as diverse as tango, chanson, house, reggae and lounge (but no Brazilian rhythms at all). None of the members are actually from Brazil and the only female in the band is the Italian singer Sabina Sciubba. Other members include Argentine keyboardist Didi Gutman, drummer Aaron Johnston and bassist Jesse Murphy.

The band released four studio albums: their self-titled debut on 1 February 2005, Talk to La Bomb on 12 September 2006, and New York City on 5 August 2008, and Let's make Love  on 13 April 2018.

The singer, Sabina Sciubba is known for her fashionable stage-wear and for her enigmatic stage persona. Her outfits were designed by Threeasfour, Gemma Kahng, Carolina K.  and others.

History
The band formed in 2003, performing at a New York City club, Nublu. While playing a weekly gig, the band wrote many of the original songs that would appear on their debut album, which was eventually released in February 2005.

In 2007, the band released their second album, entitled Talk to La Bomb, featuring the single "Jique." They toured widely across the United States, Latin America and Europe, appearing on several TV shows, notably David Letterman and Jimmy Kimmel.

They also covered Talking Heads' "Crosseyed And Painless" for the AIDS benefit album Silencio=Muerte: Red Hot + Latin Redux produced by the Red Hot Organization.

Their third album, New York City, came out in 2008. They toured through October, at which time the band took a break for Sciubba to have a child. The song "Good Time" off of New York City was featured in an ad for Amstel Light.

In 2008, David Byrne appeared as a guest on their single "I'm losing myself".

In 2009, the album New York City was nominated for a Grammy Award for Best Dance/Electronica Album.

In June 2011, despite rumors of a split, Brazilian Girls collaborated with Forró in the Dark and Angélique Kidjo on the track "Aquele Abraço" for the Red Hot Organization's newest charitable album Red Hot+Rio 2. Proceeds from the sales will be donated to raise awareness and money to fight HIV/AIDS and related health and social issues.

In April 2012, the band reunited, playing live shows and recording new material.

In February 2014, Sabina Sciubba released a solo record on Bar None Records, called Toujours.

On 12 March 2015, during the band's well-attended performance at Thalia Hall in Chicago's Pilsen Historic District, band member Sabina Sciubba as well as the keyboardist repeatedly announced that the band's new album had just been completed and would be issued later in the year.

On 13 April 2018, the band released their fourth album, Let's Make Love.

The band has not performed in the original formation since 2019. Following a band dispute, some band members continue to perform under the name "Brazilian Girls" without Sabina Sciubba. The group has worked with a variety of singers and instrumentalists during that time.

Discography

Albums
 Brazilian Girls (2005)
 Talk to La Bomb (2006)
 New York City (2008)
 Let's Make Love (2018)

Singles and EPs
 Lazy Lover EP (2004)
 "Don't Stop" 2005)
 More Than Pussy – The Remix EP (2007)
 "The Critic" (2016)
 "Pirates" (2018)

Videos
 Brazilian Girls: Live in NYC (2005)

References

External links

 New York Times interview with Sabina Sciubba
 Rehearsal Space: Brazilian Girls
 LAist.com 9/23/08 Interview with Sabina Sciubba

Alternative dance musical groups
Electronic music groups from New York (state)
Verve Forecast Records artists
Fiction Records artists
Downtempo musicians